Sophie Howe (born c. 1977) is the Future Generations Commissioner for Wales, appointed in 2016. She had previously been a local councillor and worked as a special political advisor and deputy police and crime commissioner.

Career
Howe was elected as a local councillor for the ward of Whitchurch & Tongwynlais in 1999 when she was 21, serving for 9 years, and initially was the youngest elected councillor in Wales. Howe worked part-time for the Cardiff North MP Julie Morgan while she was at university. She has been employed to manage the legal department of the Equal Opportunities Commission. She was the first deputy South Wales Police and Crime Commissioner and has been special advisor to two First Ministers of Wales. Her areas of expertise lie within communities, local government, equality and community safety.

She was appointed as the Future Generations Commissioner for Wales, a role created as part of the Well-being of Future Generations (Wales) Act 2015 that came into force on 1 April 2016 aiming to make Wales a better place to live. Her term extends to 2023. The remit is a statutory obligation as “the guardian of the interests of future generations in Wales” to provide guidance and advice to the government and public bodies in Wales when they make decisions so that they think about effects on people in the future as well as now. Although formal powers are limited, the power to require justifications for decisions can influence policy. She promotes public involvement, preventative action and cross-government collaboration to improve decision making.

Howe advised the Welsh government against building a bypass around Newport linked to the M4 motorway because it would result in financial debt for the future as well as destroy local biodiversity.

In 2019 Howe introduced a policy of paid leave for staff in her office experiencing domestic abuse. This policy was later adopted by the Welsh government and also a local authority. In 2020 she went further to provide financial support for staff when leaving an abusive relationship in the form of a salary advance, loan or small grant.

In October 2020 Howe initiated a Manifesto for the Future study into providing a basic income for all citizens in parallel with a shorter working week as a response to unemployment caused by the COVID-19 pandemic. These were already recommended in an earlier report she had published in March 2020. She subsequently said that a universal basic income and a shorter working week should be piloted by the next Welsh Government. Her list of suggestions also recommends an emphasis on green policies. These recommendations came ahead of the 2021 Senedd election, to elect members of the Senedd, and the next Welsh Government.

Howe has talked about the Well-being of Future Generations (Wales) Act 2015 at events as diverse as the literary Hay Festival in 2019 and when meeting with Housing Women Cymru.

She is a fellow of Swansea University and honorary research fellow at Cardiff Business School in Cardiff University.

Awards
Howe was awarded an honorary doctorate by the University of Wales Trinity Saint David in July 2019.

In November 2020 she was included in the BBC Radio 4 Woman's Hour Power list 2020.

Personal life
Howe was born around 1977 and lived in Ely, Cardiff. She attended school in Rhiwbina. Her parents were active in local politics.  She studied law and politics at university. She now lives in Cardiff and is married to Ceri Lovett. Their first child was born while they were in their final year at university. They have five children.

References

1970s births
Living people
Academics of Cardiff Business School
People associated with Swansea University
People associated with University of Wales Trinity Saint David
Councillors in Cardiff
Welsh Labour councillors
Women councillors in Wales